The Elbphilharmonie ("Elbe Philharmonic Hall"), popularly nicknamed Elphi, is a concert hall in the HafenCity quarter of Hamburg, Germany, on the Grasbrook peninsula of the Elbe River. It is among the largest in the world.

The new glassy construction resembles a hoisted sail, water wave, iceberg or quartz crystal resting on top of an old brick warehouse (Kaispeicher A, built in 1963) near the historical Speicherstadt. The project is the result of a private initiative by the architect and real estate developer Alexander Gérard and his wife Jana Marko, an art historian, who commissioned the original design by the Swiss architecture firm Herzog & de Meuron, who developed and promoted the project (since 2003 in cooperation with the Hamburg-based real estate developer and investor Dieter Becken) for 3.5 years until the City of Hamburg decided to develop the project by itself.

The Elbphilharmonie was officially inaugurated with concerts of the NDR Elbphilharmonie Orchestra and a light show on 11 January 2017.

History
On 2 April 2007, the foundation stone was laid in the  warehouse, in the presence of then First Mayor of Hamburg Ole von Beust, Hochtief Construction AG CEO Henner Mahlstedt, the project coordinator for the City of Hamburg Hartmut Wegener (dismissed in 2008 for mismanagement of the project), Hamburg Minister of Culture Karin von Welck and architect Pierre de Meuron.

In 2007, the construction was scheduled to be finished by 2010 with an estimated cost of €241 million. In November 2008, after the original contract was amended, the costs for the project were estimated at €450 million. In August 2012, the costs were re-estimated to be over €500 million, which should also cover the increased cost for a strengthened roof. Construction work officially ended on 31 October 2016 at a cost of €866 million.

The first public test concert at the Elbphilharmonie was held on 25 November 2016. The official opening concert took place on 11 January 2017 with a performance by the NDR Elbphilharmonie Orchestra under direction of Thomas Hengelbrock. The first musical selection was "Pan" from Benjamin Britten's Six Metamorphoses after Ovid.

Building

The building is designed as a cultural and residential complex. The original 1966 brick façade of the Kaispeicher A, formerly a warehouse, was retained at the base of the building. On top of this a footprint-matching superstructure rests on its own foundation exhibiting a glassy exterior and a wavy roof line. About one thousand glass windows are curved. The building has 26 floors with the first eight floors within the brick façade. The footprint of the building measures . A curved escalator from the main entrance at the east side connects the ground floor with an observation deck, the Plaza, at the 8th floor, the top of the brick section. The Plaza is accessible by the public. It offers a view of Hamburg and the Elbe. From the Plaza the foyer of the concert hall can be reached.

The Elbphilharmonie has three concert venues. The Great Concert Hall can accommodate 2,100 visitors whereby the performers are in the center of the hall surrounded by the audience in the vineyard style arrangement. The acoustics were designed by Yasuhisa Toyota who installed about 10,000 individually microshaped drywall plates to disperse sound waves. The Great Concert Hall contains a pipe organ with 69 registers built by Klais Orgelbau. The Recital Hall is intended for the performance of recitals, chamber music and jazz concerts; it can hold an audience of 550 people. In addition, there is the Kaistudio that allows for 170 visitors and is intended to serve educational activities. The consultant for the scenography of the concert hall was Ducks Scéno.

The easternmost part of the building is rented by Westin as the Westin Hamburg Hotel that opened on 4 November 2016. The hotel offers 244 rooms between the 9th and 20th floors. The lobby in the 8th floor can be accessed from the Plaza. The upper floors west of the concert hall accommodate 45 luxury apartments. The complex also houses conference rooms, restaurants, bars, and a spa. A parking garage for 433 cars is part of the building complex as well.

Controversy
The project was criticized because of its cost and schedule overruns; construction was originally estimated to cost about €200 million, while the final cost was €870 million. However, upon completion, Der Spiegel in a comparative analysis suggested that the overrun was relatively "modest" compared to some other international mega-projects.

Despite the efforts of acoustician Yasuhisa Toyota, complaints about poor acoustics in the hall have been aired. After the grand opening on 11 January 2017, many musicians as well as conductors called the acoustics in the hall "appalling" and "terrible".  An initial review noted that "the hall is bright, very dry, direct, unforgiving. You can hear everything and immediately, for better and worse" and that "every sound—including coughs—can be heard most excellently in the hall. Every hawk, every sneeze and wheeze, every unwrapped lozenge shoots out, dry, like a daggered exclamation mark." On the other hand, in a 2019 performance of Mahler's Das Lied von der Erde, audience members shouted, "can't hear you" at tenor Jonas Kaufmann, who himself later complained, "This hall does not help...".

Public transport

Ferry services
Elbphilharmonie is the name of a ferry pier, reachable from Hamburg's St. Pauli Piers.

Gallery

References

External links

 
 Picture of the Elbe Philharmonic Hall
 Live Webcam showing the Elbphilharmonie
 Elbphilharmonie Sessions, a live concert of techno marching band MEUTE on the rooftop, with aerial views of the building, 2021 [39:27]

Buildings and structures in Hamburg-Mitte
Culture in Hamburg
Music in Hamburg
Concert halls in Germany
Deconstructivism
Herzog & de Meuron buildings
Tourist attractions in Hamburg
Skyscrapers in Hamburg
Residential skyscrapers in Germany
Skyscraper hotels in Germany
Music venues completed in 2017
2017 establishments in Germany